Megatibicen auletes commonly, but informally called the northern dusk-singing cicada, giant oak cicada, or southern oak cicada, is a species of cicada in the family Cicadidae. It is found in the eastern United States and portions of southeastern Canada.

Notes
M. auletes is the largest cicada species in North America north of Mexico. It is associated with Quercus.

References

Hemiptera of North America
Cryptotympanini
Insects described in 1834